In statistics, the Champernowne distribution is a symmetric, continuous probability distribution, describing random variables that take both positive and negative values. It is a generalization of the logistic distribution that was introduced by D. G. Champernowne. Champernowne developed the distribution to describe the logarithm of income.

Definition
The Champernowne distribution has a probability density function given by

where  are positive parameters, and n is the normalizing constant, which depends on the parameters. The density may be rewritten as

using the fact that

Properties

The density f(y) defines a symmetric distribution with median y0, which has tails somewhat heavier than a normal distribution.

Special cases
In the special case  it is the Burr Type XII density.

When , 

which is the density of the standard logistic distribution.

Distribution of income 

If the distribution of Y, the logarithm of income, has a Champernowne distribution, then the density function of the income X = exp(Y) is 

where x0 = exp(y0) is the median income. If λ = 1, this distribution is often called the Fisk distribution, which has density

See also
Generalized logistic distribution

References 

Continuous distributions